Rai Quinton Arthur Simons (born 11 January 1996) is a Bermudian professional footballer who plays as a striker. He has been capped six times, and scored one goal for the Bermuda national team in FIFA recognised matches. He was joint-top goal scorer at the 2013 Island Games Men's Football Tournament with three goals.

Club career
Simons started his career at North Village Rams as a youth player. At the age 15, Simons had trials and spent a week training with Premier League club West Ham United, before he eventually signed for Newcastle Town. He was part of the Newcastle Town under-18 team that won the Sentinel Cup in a record 8–1 win over Alsager Town at the Britannia Stadium, scoring with an "unstoppable shot" having replaced Callum Kenny in the 57th minute as a substitute.

He went on to join English Northern Premier League club Ilkeston in summer 2013, signing a two-year contract with the club. During his time at Ilkeston, Simons played for both the academy and first team sides, before attracting interest from a number of Football League clubs. He was a key member of the Ilkeston team which reached the Northern Premier League Premier Division play-off final in the 2014–15 season.

In April 2015, it was announced that Simons had joined League One club Chesterfield. He scored his first Chesterfield goal in a pre-season friendly against his former club Ilkeston, which had been arranged as part of the transfer deal. Simons made his professional debut on 26 September 2015 as a 66th minute substitute in Chesterfield's 2–1 home defeat to Burton Albion. He scored his first professional goal on 10 October in Chesterfield's 3–1 home defeat to Gillingham.

International career
Simons played for Bermuda under-17's in their unsuccessful 2013 CONCACAF U-17 Championship qualifying campaign in July 2012.

Whilst studying as a student at Newcastle-under-Lyme College, Simons was selected to represent the English Colleges under-17's in January 2013 at the Caput Mundi Tournament in Italy.

Simons went on to represent Bermuda, the only FIFA affiliated side at the 2013 Island Games. Bermuda went on to win men's football tournament, with a 1–0 win over Greenland on 15 July 2013 at Bermuda National Stadium, Hamilton. Simons scored three goals during the competition, leaving him as joint-top goal scorer along with five other players.

In April 2015, he was then called up to the Bermuda under-20's squad for their 2015 CONCACAF U-20 Championship qualifying campaign. He scored a hat-trick in the group match against Guadeloupe under-20's on 24 June 2014 at Estadio Panamericano, San Cristóbal.

Simons was called up and made his full international debut for Bermuda against Grenada, in a FIFA sanctioned match, on 7 March 2015 in a friendly. The match finished 2–2, with Simons scoring on his debut before being substituted in the 81st minute for Antwan Russell. Following his success in two friendlies against Grenada, Simons was called up again to face the Bahamas in the 2018 FIFA World Cup qualification first round matches. He played in both matches, with Bermuda winning 8–0 on aggregate.

Personal life
Simons moved to England when he was 15 and stayed with his cousin, Dale Eve and sister, Taylor in Stoke-on-Trent where he attended school. His mother is Karen Simons and his father, Arthur Simons was also a footballer who played as a left-back for North Village Rams.

Career statistics

Club

International
Scores and results list Bermuda's goal tally first, score column indicates score after each Simons goal.

References

External links

Chesterfield profile

1996 births
Living people
People from Hamilton Parish
Association football forwards
Bermudian footballers
Bermuda international footballers
Newcastle Town F.C. players
Ilkeston F.C. players
Chesterfield F.C. players
North Village Rams players
Bermudian expatriate footballers
Expatriate footballers in England